Craig Trindall (born 8 May 1979) is an Australian former professional rugby league footballer who played for the Penrith Panthers in the National Rugby League. His position was halfback or five-eighth. He is a relative of former South Sydney Rabbitohs player, Darrell Trindall.

Background
Trindall was born in Wee Waa, New South Wales, Australia.

Career highlights 

Junior Club: Colyton Colts
Previous Clubs: Windsor
First Grade Debut: 2006 v Cowboys

Controversy 

In 2006, The National Rugby League's Anti-Doping tribunal imposed a 12-week suspended sentence on Craig Trindall for cannabis use.
			
In 2007, Craig Trindall was charged with maliciously inflicting grievous bodily harm after allegedly bashing a woman in the face with a children's blackboard.

References

External links 
Sydney Morning Herald "Nine years on, tricky Trindall gets his chance"
Official Penrith Panthers Web Site

1979 births
Living people
Australian rugby league players
Indigenous Australian rugby league players
Penrith Panthers players
Rugby league halfbacks
Rugby league players from Wee Waa
Windsor Wolves players